Kitty Is Not a Cat is an Australian animated musical television series which first aired on 7TWO in Australia on 20 April 2018.

On 21 September 2018, it was announced that it was renewed for a second season which premiered on 11 November 2019. The series was renewed for a third season in October 2019.

Plot 
Kitty Is Not a Cat follows the story of a little girl called Kitty who has a big imagination who feels like she can be anything she wants, even a cat. Kitty arrives at a house full of partying felines, who suddenly find their lives turned upside down. They attempt to teach Kitty how to be a human when she actually prefers to live her life as a cat.

Characters

Main 
 Kitty (voiced by Roslyn Oades) - The titular heroine who is not a cat. She has black hair and wears an orange cat costume with a red collar. Her skin is white, with light maroon cheeks on her face. She is an orphan.
 King Tubby (voiced by Rove McManus) - An obese black tuxedo Persian cat. He has black fur and wears a red collar and a tin can for a crown. Self-appointed "King of all cats", Tubby spends most of his time "sitting on his throne, pretending he knows just what's going on". He however regularly provides explanations on certain aspects of humanity, albeit shaky ones. Oddly, he doesn't seem to play any musical instrument.
 The Nazz (voiced by Stephen Hall) - A dark orange Norwegian forest Persian fox-cat. Maybe the oldest cat in the mansion, The Nazz is also the sanest, wisest, and most responsible one, who tries to keep a semblance of order. He's a talented and experienced piano player who composed and recorded several albums' worth of songs.
 Petal (voiced by Cal Wilson) - A Russian blue cat, soft-spoken, calm, who takes great care of others, but knows how to be firm when needed. She plays the saxophone.
 Timmy Tom (voiced by Rachel King) - A light blue tabby cat. The youngest of all the cats, Timmy is almost always seen in Kitty's company, and they always get along wonderfully. He can still play a few instruments, notably pianos.
 Miley (voiced by Rachel King) - A light pink tabby cat. She has pink fur with a light pink belly. She wears glasses. A brilliant, snarky, sour loner, Miley is usually seen reading a book or cultivating her individuality. She has a well-hidden soft spot for Kitty, which doesn't stop her from expressing her criticism in her idiosyncratic way. She can use a keyboard, but her specialty is samples, synthwave and electronic music.
 Cheeta (voiced by Rove McManus) - A cyan Siamese cat, no one is ever sure if what is going to come out of Cheeta's mouth; will be a creative piece of advice, or some more nonsense solution that will likely make the problem worse. Still, he sometimes has good (if unusual) ideas, and plays the guitar.
 Ginsburg (voiced by Vincent Milesi) - A cyan tabby cat, Little is shown about Ginsburg, safe from the fact that he is usually not very quick, likes to end his sentences in "Man", and is an incredible drummer.
 Pierre (voiced by Rupert Degas) - A cyan tabby cat, Refined, elegant, and French, Pierre is the mansion's cook and plays the bass.
 Ming (voiced by Rupert Degas) - An obese Balinese persian cat. Scary, cold and distant, Ming behaves like an inscrutable Sci-Fi B-Movie villain. He's always had very ambivalent feelings towards the mansion's new resident. He plays keyboards in a very personal manner.
 Mr. Clean (voiced by Rupert Degas) - A Maine Coon-Manx cat. Small, dirty, and simple, Mr. Clean is a humble cat who is very satisfied with his own hygiene. He's been shown to know how to grow fruit and vegetables, which he himself sums up as, He apparently plays the violin.
 Happy (voiced by Rupert Degas) - A Chartreux eyes-closed cat, Happy would have a hard time seeing his own paws, but this handicap has resulted in a unique character trait: since he can't see the bad in anything, then everything is amazing to him all the time! He provides lighthearted comic relief and plays the trombone.
 Last Chance (voiced by Rove McManus) - A green injured tabby cat. Everyone knows cats have nine lives. Last Chance is on his, well, last one, but he isn't going to let this bring him down. He plays the trumpet, and announces King Tubby's arrivals and house meetings.
 Thorn (voiced by Cal Wilson) - A black and white Sphynx cat. She has black fur with a white muzzle and belly. She wears a red collar around her neck. She also wears a pair of white boots. Dark, menacing, classy, and cold, Thorn may seem scary, but has shown more many times how deeply she cares for little Kitty. She is an impressive singer.
 Spook (voiced by Jamie Aditya) - An Abyssinian-Munchkin arachnophobic cat. Spook perfectly illustrates the expression "scaredy cat". He's terrified, startled, or worried by nearly everything, but finds comfort in a sappy romance television show, and apparently has a knack for technology. He doesn't play instruments, but knows his way as a disc-jockey.
 Luna (voiced by Rachel King) - A brown-haired tabby cat, Luna tries to avoid effort whenever possible, except when music and dancing are involved. She plays the sithar.

Recurring 
 The mice (both voiced by Jamie Aditya) - are a pair that work for King Tubby and wheel him out of places in which they don't do happily. They frequently complain about how they aren't given a break.
 Harold Stinkleton (voiced by Rupert Degas) - One of the neighbours. He is idiosyncratically grumpy, clueless, and submissive towards his wife.
 Olive Stinkleton (voiced by Rachel King) - One of the neighbours. She is typically prissy, haughty, and bossy towards her husband.
 Stanley "Stan" Stinkleton (voiced by Marg Downey) - The youngest Stinkleton is usually depicted playing video games, eating, sleeping, and doing as little of worth as possible.
 King Tubby's Mom (voiced by Rove McManus) - An obese black tuxedo Persian cat. She is the mother of King Tubby.
 Rose (voiced by Cal Wilson) - A yellow and white Sphynx cat, she is the sister of Thorn.

Production 
Kitty Is Not a Cat is created by Bruce Kane and Maurice Argiro and produced by BES Animation for Seven Network in Australia. Kane has said that they "wanted to create a show that uniquely blends urban culture, comedy, and music with stories that connect to 6-10 year old kids."

Episodes

Broadcast 
Kitty Is Not a Cat premiered on 7TWO in Australia on 20 April 2018. In South Africa, the show premiered on Disney Channel on 23 April 2018. In New Zealand, the show is broadcast on TVNZ 2. In the United States, the first season was released for free, and out of order, on the Roku channel around December 2019. The series was given a rating of TV-Y7. In the United Kingdom, as of March 2021 episodes are available on demand via Virgin Media's Virgin Kids section. However, since these are listed by title and not by episode number it is unclear whether any episodes have been omitted.

Awards and nominations

References

External links 
 Official Website
 
 Kitty Is Not a Cat on 7plus

7two original programming
2010s Australian animated television series
2020s Australian animated television series
2018 Australian television series debuts
2010s British children's television series
BBC children's television shows
Australian children's animated television series
Australian children's animated musical television series
Australian children's animated comedy television series
English-language television shows
Australian flash animated television series
Animated television series about cats
Animated television series about children
Animated television series about mice and rats
Television shows set in Melbourne